Cecil Burton Lyon (November 8, 1903 – April 6, 1993) was an American diplomat and career foreign service officer.

Lyon was born in Staten Island, New York, and he graduated from Harvard University in 1927. He worked as an investment banker prior to entering the Foreign Service in 1931. On an early assignment, as third secretary in Tokyo, he met Elizabeth Sturgis Grew, daughter of Ambassador Joseph C. Grew. They married in 1933 and had two daughters, Alice and Lilla. Alice Lyon played the lead female role of Elaine in the 1964 B-horror film The Horror of Party Beach.

From 1956 to 1958, he served as United States Ambassador to Chile. He served as United States Ambassador to Sri Lanka (then Ceylon) from 1964 to 1967, during which time he concurrently served as United States Ambassador to the Maldives from 1965 to 1967.

He died in his home in Hancock, New Hampshire, on April 6, 1993, aged 89, due to pneumonia.

References

1903 births
1993 deaths
People from Staten Island
Ambassadors of the United States to Chile
Ambassadors of the United States to the Maldives
Ambassadors of the United States to Sri Lanka
People from Hancock, New Hampshire
Harvard University alumni
United States Foreign Service personnel
20th-century American diplomats
Deaths from pneumonia in New Hampshire